Giuseppe Alessi (born 29 December 1973) is a retired Italian footballer. 
Alessi started his career at Torino. Then he played for S.S.C. Napoli, before joining Spezia Calcio.

Honours
Serie C1: 2006
Serie C2: 2008

External links
http://aic.football.it/scheda/2287/alessi-giuseppe.htm
http://www.gazzetta.it/Speciali/serie_b_2007/giocatori/alessi_giu.shtml

Italian footballers
Torino F.C. players
S.S.C. Napoli players
U.S. Livorno 1915 players
Spezia Calcio players
A.C. Reggiana 1919 players
Serie B players
Association football midfielders
Footballers from Turin
1977 births
Living people